Encephalartos inopinus is a species of cycad that is native to Limpopo Province, South Africa.

Description
It is an arboreal plant, with stems up to 3 m high and 15–25 cm in diameter. 

It has 100-150 cm long leaves, blue or semi-glossy silver. The leaflets, 14–20 cm long and lanceolate, have the lower toothed margin and are inserted on the rachis in the opposite way at an angle of 180°.

It is a dioecious species, with male specimens that have from 1 to 3 closely ovoid cones, green in color, 18–25 cm long and 6–8 cm in diameter, and female specimens, with 1-2 cones of the same color, of oval shape, 30–35 cm long and 12 cm in diameter. Both appear in January, i.e. in the middle of summer in the northern hemisphere. Both macrosporophylls and microsporophylls have a flat, smooth and glabrous surface.

The seeds are 20–25 mm long, 15–20 mm wide and are covered with an orange flesh.

References

External links
 
 

inopinus
Endemic flora of South Africa
Flora of the Northern Provinces
Trees of South Africa
Critically endangered flora of Africa